Ivan Namaseb (born 22 June 1985) is a Namibian international football defender who currently plays for South African club F.C. AK and is part of the Namibian squad.

References

1985 births
Living people
Namibian men's footballers
Namibia international footballers
Expatriate soccer players in South Africa
Namibian expatriate sportspeople in South Africa
F.C. AK players
Place of birth missing (living people)

Association footballers not categorized by position
21st-century Namibian people